Gerard Johnstone is a New Zealand screenwriter and director. He is known for the comedy sitcom series The Jaquie Brown Diaries and the horror films Housebound and M3GAN.

Early life and career
Johnstone was born in Invercargill, New Zealand. In the early 2000s, Johnstone and Jaquie Brown worked together at C4. A few years later, they created a production company, Young, Gifted & Brown, to make the New Zealand sitcom The Jaquie Brown Diaries, based on a satirical fictionalised version of Brown. It began airing in 2008 with Johnstone serving as writer and director. 

In March 2014, Johnstone made his directorial debut with Housebound at the South by Southwest festival. The comedy horror film was released on 17 October 2014 in select theatres and VOD. The following year, Johnstone approached New Zeland weightlifter Sonia Manaena, who set the world record in 2013 for deadlifting, about directing a film detailing her life being a competitive weightlifter. Filming was scheduled to begin in 2016, but as of 2023 Johnstone said, "It's been cooking in the background for a long time". 

In 2016, he released Terry Teo, a reboot of the 1985 television series, Terry and the Gunrunners.  By August 2017, Johnstone was reported to be in the running to direct Warner Bros.'s Dark Universe, but instead was hired to polish the script.  

Johnstone directed episodes of the first season of The New Legends of Monkey, airing in 2018.  That same year, he signed on to direct the comedy horror film, M3GAN. Producer James Wan chose Johnstone for the job after admiring his ability to balance horror and comedy elements in Housebound. M3GAN was released on 6 January 2023 to commercial and critical success. It grossed over $30 million on its opening weekend and garnered positive reviews.

Personal life 
Johnstone is married. He has two sons, born in 2012 and 2014, respectively.

Filmography
Film

Television

References

External links
 

English-language film directors
New Zealand film directors
New Zealand screenwriters
New Zealand television directors
New Zealand television writers
Year of birth missing (living people)
Living people